Cave Kids (also known as Cave Kids Adventures or Cave Kids: Pebbles & Bamm-Bamm) is an American animated preschool television series produced by Hanna-Barbera, and a spin-off of The Flintstones. The show aired in syndication on public television stations from September 29 to November 17, 1996, with reruns available until 1999.

Overview
The series follows the adventures of Pebbles Flintstone and Bamm-Bamm Rubble as prehistoric pre-schoolers with Dino, the Flintstone family's pet dinosaur, as their babysitter. While Pebbles and Bamm-Bamm spoke in baby-talk gibberish to adults, they could communicate normally with each other, a la Rugrats (another show that Bamm-Bamm's voice actresses, Cavanaugh and Daily worked on). Unlike the original 1960s Flintstones series and its spin-off incarnations featuring the kids and their parents in slapstick comedy adventures, this show focused more on educational values and lessons for children, with each episode also concluding with an original song using often-altered footage from the episode. Another thing worth noting is that Pebbles, Bamm-Bamm and Dino were the only established characters to appear in the show and everyone else was completely absent.

An earlier Cave Kids effort was published by Golden Press, both as a Little Golden Books in 1963, and also as a Gold Key Comics series spanning 16 issues from 1963 through 1967.

Voice cast
 Aria Noelle Curzon as Pebbles Flintstone
 Taylor Gunther as Baby Pebbles
 Christine Cavanaugh as Bamm-Bamm Rubble (singing voice provided by E.G. Daily)
 Frank Welker as Dino

Episodes

Merchandising

Album
A sing-along album, Cave Kids Sing-Along, was released on cassette tape and CD by Kid Rhino on February 4, 1997. The album featured seven songs performed by Pebbles and Bamm-Bamm, including five from the series. The package also contained a full-color booklet with lyrics to all the songs.

Track listing
 "Cave Kids Theme"
 "The Cave Kid Crawl"
 "The Woman in the Moon"
 "Little Is Just Right for Me"
 "Sharing"
 "Hand in Hand"
 "Being a Friend"

Home media
On June 10, 1997, Warner Home Video released three separate Cave Kids titles on videocassette: "Watch Us Grow", "At Play" and "Make New Friends", with each 44-minute cassette featuring two episodes and a music video.

See also
List of works produced by Hanna-Barbera Productions

References

External links

 
 

1990s American animated television series
1990s American children's comedy television series
1996 American television series debuts
1996 American television series endings
1990s preschool education television series
American children's animated adventure television series
American children's animated comedy television series
American children's animated fantasy television series
American preschool education television series
Animated preschool education television series
American animated television spin-offs
The Flintstones spin-offs
English-language television shows
Cartoon Network original programming
PBS original programming
PBS Kids shows
Animated television series about children
Animated television series about siblings
Animated television series about dinosaurs
Works about friendship
Television series set in prehistory
Television series by Hanna-Barbera